Sitalpati  is a village development committee in Sankhuwasabha District in the Kosi Zone of north-eastern Nepal. At the time of the 1991 Nepal census it had a population of 4862 people living in 975 individual households.

List of villages
Khartuwa
Heluwa
Angla
Pangma
Malingtar
Simle

References

Populated places in Sankhuwasabha District